The following organizations survey and accredit hospitals and healthcare organizations in the US.

Medicare and Medicaid deeming
A number have deeming power for Medicare and Medicaid. 
American Association for Accreditation of Ambulatory Surgery Facilities (AAAASF)
Accreditation Association for Ambulatory Health Care (AAAHC)
Accreditation Commission for Health Care (ACHC)
 American Board for Certification in Orthotics, Prosthetics & Pedorthics (ABC)
 Board of Certification/Accreditation, International (BOC)
 Center for Improvement in Healthcare Quality (CIHQ)
 Commission on Accreditation of Rehabilitation Facilities (CARF)
 Community Health Accreditation Program
 DNV GL Healthcare
 Foundation for the Accreditation of Cellular Therapy (FACT)
 Global Healthcare Accreditation (GHA)
 Healthcare Facilities Accreditation Program (HFAP)
 Healthcare Quality Association on Accreditation (HQAA)
 Institute for Medical Quality (IMQ)
 Joint Commission (TJC)
 National Committee for Quality Assurance (NCQA)
 National Dialysis Accreditation Commission (NDAC)
 The Compliance Team, "Exemplary Provider Programs"
 The Intersocietal Accreditation Commission(IAC) 
 Utilization Review Accreditation Commission (URAC)

Education accreditation

Birth Centers
The Commission for the Accreditation of Birth Centers

Emergency Medicine
National Registry of Emergency Medical Technicians (NREMT)

Medicine
Accreditation Council for Continuing Medical Education
Federation of State Medical Boards
National Board of Medical Examiners

Nursing
National Council of State Boards of Nursing

College of Nursing accreditation
American Association of Colleges of Nursing
Commission on Collegiate Nursing Education
National League for Nursing

Advanced practice nursing college accreditation
American College of Nurse-Midwives
Council of Accreditation of Nurse Anesthesia Educational Programs

Respiratory care
College of respiratory care accreditation
Committee on Accreditation for Respiratory Care
Non-governmental credentialing bodies
National Board for Respiratory Care

Surgery
Association of Surgical Technologists

Therapeutics
American Occupational Therapy Association (AOTA)
American Physical Therapy Association (APTA)
National Board of Certified Occupational Therapy (NBCOT)

References

Lists of medical and health organizations
Healthcare accreditation
United States health-related lists